The twenty-first season of the American animated television series Family Guy premiered on Fox on September 25, 2022. This season also features the series' 400th episode.

The series follows the dysfunctional Griffin family, consisting of father Peter, mother Lois, daughter Meg, son Chris, baby Stewie, and the family dog Brian, who reside in their hometown of Quahog, Rhode Island.

Season twenty-one premiered the run of the twentieth production season, which is to be executive produced by Seth MacFarlane, Alec Sulkin, Richard Appel, Steve Callaghan, Danny Smith, Kara Vallow, Mark Hentemann, Tom Devanney, and Patrick Meighan. Sulkin and Appel returned as the series' showrunners.

Production
On September 23, 2020, Fox announced that Family Guy had been renewed for a twentieth and twenty-first season, ensuring that the series will last another two years. As revealed at Comic-Con 2022, Season 21 is featuring guest stars like Mario Lopez, Gerald McRaney, Jay Pharoah, Martha Plimpton, and Casey Wilson. It also features the series' milestone 400th episode, "Love Story Guy", which aired on January 8, 2023; however, the episode "Get Stewie", which aired on November 20, was publicized as such.

Episodes

References

2022 American television seasons
Family Guy seasons
2023 American television seasons